Pasta ca nunnata is a pasta dish originating from Sicily made with newborn fish which may be anchovies, sardines, red mullet, or bream, as well as spaghetti, olive oil, garlic, parsley, white wine and black pepper. Sardines are most common and preferred, especially in the Palermo area. Where bream is used, the most common species is common pandora known as luvari, uvari, or luari in Sicilian. Tomatoes are sometimes added but this is less common. The dish is also sometimes referred to as pasta ca sfighiata.

See also

List of Sicilian dishes
List of pasta dishes

References

Cuisine of Sicily
Palermitan cuisine
Pasta dishes